Monique Berlioux (22 December 1923 – 27 August 2015) was a French swimmer. Berlioux competed in the women's 100 metre backstroke at the 1948 Summer Olympics. Despite being of French nationality she won the ASA National British Championships 150 yards backstroke title in 1946.

References

External links
 

1923 births
2015 deaths
French female backstroke swimmers
Olympic swimmers of France
Swimmers at the 1948 Summer Olympics
Sportspeople from Metz
20th-century French women
21st-century French women